Sandy Is a Lady is a 1940 American comedy film directed by Charles Lamont and written by Charles Grayson. The film stars Baby Sandy, Billy Lenhart, Kenneth Brown, Eugene Pallette, Nan Grey, Tom Brown, Mischa Auer, Billy Gilbert and Edgar Kennedy. The film was released on May 21, 1940, by Universal Pictures.

Plot

Cast        
Baby Sandy as Baby Sandy
Billy Lenhart as Pat 
Kenneth Brown as Mike 
Eugene Pallette as P.J. Barnett
Nan Grey as Mary Phillips
Tom Brown as Joe Phillips
Mischa Auer as Felix Lobo Smith
Billy Gilbert as Billy Pepino
Edgar Kennedy as Officer Rafferty
Fritz Feld as Mario
Anne Gwynne as Millie
Richard Lane as Philip Jarvis
Charles C. Wilson as Sergeant
Joe Downing as Nick Case
John Kelly as Murphy
William Haade as Truck Driver
George Meeker as Mr. Porter
Kay Linaker as Mrs. Porter

References

External links
 

1940 films
American comedy films
1940 comedy films
Universal Pictures films
Films directed by Charles Lamont
American black-and-white films
1940s English-language films
1940s American films